101.7 WSFM (call sign: 2UUS) is a radio station broadcasting in Sydney, Australia. Its main content is commercial music, in particular classic hits from the 1960s to today, but with a stronger focus on 80s hits. The station is part of the Pure Gold Network (which itself is a part of ARN).

WS FM's main frequency is 101.7 MHz on the FM band, with two repeaters in the outer suburbs of Sydney: 88.3 MHz in the Macarthur region, and 99.1 MHz centred in the Richmond/Hawkesbury region. It previously transmitted on 1224 kHz on the AM band; this frequency is now used by print-handicapped radio station 2RPH.

Music
WS FM's former catchlines were Sydney's Classic Hits....Good Times and Great Classic Hits.....Real music, real variety & Better Music and More of It. WSFM generally plays Pure gold classic hits from the last four decades, as well as current hits.

History
Liverpool Broadcasting and Transmitting Co Pty Ltd was granted an AM radio license in the late 1970s, specifically to serve the Western Suburbs of Sydney. 2WS began broadcasting at 12:24AM on 23 November 1978, the same day all Australian AM radio stations switched from 10 kHz to 9 kHz frequencies from temporary studios in a relocated cottage at 2 Leabons Lane, Seven Hills with a 5 kW transmitter located at nearby Prospect.  

The studios subsequently moved, in October 1979, into a purpose built complex behind the old cottage in Leabons Lane. The original building was demolished, with the material donated to charity.

In the early 1990s the station was granted an FM licence covering the full Sydney metropolitan area. Its original FM transmitter site was located at Channel 9 Willoughby, later moving in with sister station, MIX106.5 (now KIIS) to Artarmon, in northern Sydney. The official callsign was changed to 2UUS (using a literal 'double-U' to compensate for the extra letter required), although the station still identified as 2WS until 2001, when they changed their on-air name to WSFM.

2WS, 1224 on the A.M. band converted to the FM band and began broadcasting as 2WS-FM on 101.7 MHz in 1 June 1993 at 8a.m..

WSFM now broadcasts from studios at North Ryde. The building also houses facilities for KIIS 106.5 and CADA, both also owned by  ARN.

The previous studios in Seven Hills are now serviced by Christian/Adult Contemporary radio station, Hope 103.2.

References

Radio stations in Sydney
Radio stations established in 1978
Classic hits radio stations in Australia
Australian Radio Network